Rescue is a Philippine television documentary show broadcast by GMA Network. Hosted by Arnold Clavio, it premiered on May 13, 2010. The show concluded on February 14, 2013. It was replaced by Kandidato in its timeslot.

Premise
The show features actual footages of raids, rescue operations of emergency response teams, on-site accidents, and numerous other life-threatening situations.

Ratings
According to AGB Nielsen Philippines' Mega Manila household television ratings, the final episode of Rescue scored a 7.3% rating.

Accolades

References

External links
 

2010 Philippine television series debuts
2013 Philippine television series endings
Filipino-language television shows
GMA Network original programming
GMA Integrated News and Public Affairs shows
Philippine documentary television series